Šiauliai Arena is the largest arena in Šiauliai, Lithuania. It generally hosts basketball games as well as concerts. The basketball club BC Šiauliai, which currently competes in the domestic LKL and ULEB Cup, uses the facility for all of its European and LKL home fixtures. It opened on 25 July 2007. The arena had hosted the Eurobasket 2011 Group B matches from 31 August 2011 to 5 September 2011.

In 2013 Šiauliai Arena hosted Davis Cup matches.

Building
Holographic glass shining in the sun on the outside throughout four out of five floors makes the arena stand out from the other buildings. The Šiauliai Arena is capable to accommodate 7,400 people during the concerts, while it features 5,700 seats for basketball games. The arena was built by Panevėžio statybos trestas from Panevėžys in 18 months. The total cost exceeded 75 million Litas (27 million USD). The parking lot next to the arena has the capacity for 600 cars.

Gallery

See also
 List of indoor arenas in Lithuania

External links

 

Indoor arenas in Lithuania
Basketball venues in Lithuania
Sport in Šiauliai
Sports venues completed in 2007
Buildings and structures in Šiauliai
Tennis venues in Lithuania